The state of Indiana is home to two major professional sport franchises, and a number of college sports teams. Indiana is also prominent in auto racing.

Professional sports teams

Indiana has a rich basketball heritage that reaches back to the formative years of the sport itself. Although Canadian educator and inventor James Naismith developed basketball in Springfield, Massachusetts in 1891, Indiana is where high school basketball was born. In 1925, Naismith visited an Indiana basketball state finals game along with 15,000 screaming fans and later wrote "Basketball really had its origin in Indiana, which remains the center of the sport." The 1986 film Hoosiers is inspired by the story of the 1954 Indiana state champions Milan High School.

 Indiana has produced more National Basketball Association (NBA) players per capita than any other state. Muncie has produced the most per capita of any American city, with two other Indiana cities in the top ten. Professional basketball player Larry Bird was born in West Baden Springs and was raised in French Lick. He went on to lead the Boston Celtics to the NBA championship in 1981, 1984, and 1986.

The Indiana Pacers of the NBA play their home games at Gainbridge Fieldhouse; they began play in 1967 in the American Basketball Association (ABA) and joined the NBA when the leagues merged in 1976.

Indianapolis is home to the Indianapolis Colts. The Colts are members of the South Division of the American Football Conference. The Colts have roots back to 1913 as the Dayton Triangles. They became an official team after moving to Baltimore, MD, in 1953. In 1984, the Colts relocated to Indianapolis, leading to an eventual rivalry with the Baltimore Ravens. After calling the RCA Dome home for 25 years, the Colts currently play their home games at Lucas Oil Stadium in Indianapolis. While in Baltimore, the Colts won the 1970 Super Bowl. In Indianapolis, the Colts won Super Bowl XLI, bringing the franchise total to two. In recent years the Colts have regularly competed in the NFL playoffs.

List of current professional and amateur teams

*–Denotes a club that is on hiatus

List of former professional and amateur teams

College sports

Indiana has had great sports success at the collegiate level. NCAA Division I athletic programs in the state are:

Motorsport
Indiana has an extensive history with motorsport. Indianapolis hosts the Indianapolis 500 mile race over Memorial Day weekend at the Indianapolis Motor Speedway every May since 1911. The name of the race is usually shortened to "Indy 500" and also goes by the nickname "The Greatest Spectacle in Racing." The race attracts over 250,000 people every year, making it the largest single day sporting event in the world. The track also hosts the Brickyard 400 of the NASCAR Cup Series since 1994. From 2000 to 2007, it hosted the United States Grand Prix (Formula One). From 2008 to 2015, it hosted the Indianapolis motorcycle Grand Prix.

Indiana features the world's largest and most prestigious drag race, the NHRA's U.S. Nationals, held each Labor Day weekend at Lucas Oil Indianapolis Raceway Park in Clermont, Indiana.

The United States Auto Club is headquartered next to the Indianapolis Motor Speedway, and sanctions the Indiana Midget Week in June and the Indiana Sprint Week in July. Notable short ovals in Indiana include Indianapolis Raceway Park (NASCAR Trucks and USAC Silver Crown), Anderson Speedway (Little 500 and ARCA/CRA Redbud 400), Salem Speedway (ARCA, USAC Silver Crown), Terre Haute Action Track (USAC Silver Crown Sumar Classic, Hut Hundred, Hulman Classic), and Winchester Speedway (USAC Silver Crown and ARCA/CRA Winchester 400). The Indiana State Fairgrounds used to host the USAC Silver Crown Hoosier Hundred from 1953 to 2020.

Ironman Raceway hosts annual rounds of the Grand National Cross Country since 1995 and the AMA Motocross Championship since 2014. In addition, the AMA Supercross Championship visited the RCA Dome from 1998 to 2008, and the Lucas Oil Stadium has hosted a round since 2009.

Indiana is also host to a major unlimited hydroplane racing power boat race circuits in the major H1 Unlimited league, the Madison Regatta (Madison).

Horse racing
Pari-mutuel betting was legalized in 1989. Hoosier Park opened in Anderson in 1994, and off-track betting parlors opened in the state in 1995. Indiana Downs opened in Shelbyville in 2002. Hoosier Park became a racino on 2008 and Indiana Downs did the same in 2009.

Sports venues

List of Championships

References

External links